The Anti-Lynching Bill of 1937, also known as the Gavagan-Wagner Act or Wagner-Gavagan Act, was a proposed anti-lynching legislation sponsored by Democrats Joseph A. Gavagan and Robert F. Wagner, both from New York. It was introduced in response to the failure of the U.S. Senate to pass the 1934–35 Costigan-Wagner Act.

The bill passed the United States House of Representatives with support from Republicans and Northern Democrats. It did not pass the Senate due to a filibuster by Texas liberal segregationist Tom Connally.

References

United States proposed federal civil rights legislation
Lynching in the United States
Anti-lynching movement